The following is a list of currently operating hospitals in South Sudan.

References

Hospitals
South Sudan
Health in South Sudan
Hospitals
South Sudan